Stary Shigay (İśke Şığay) is a rural locality (a selo) in Sabayevsky Selsoviet, Buzdyaksky District, Bashkortostan, Russia. The population was 153 as of 2010. There are 2 streets.

Geography 
Stary Shigay is located 39 km north of Buzdyak (the district's administrative centre) by road. Sabayevo is the nearest rural locality.

References 

Rural localities in Buzdyaksky District